is a Japanese voice actress. She is affiliated with Aoni Production.

On March 3, 2021, it was announced that Terui married Go player Tomoya Hirata.

On July 3, 2022, Terui tested positive for COVID-19.

Biography

Filmography

Anime series
Gakkatsu! (2012), Inaba, Kimoto
Aikatsu! (2013), Yū Hattori
Fantasista Doll (2013), Amsterdam; Champa
Kyōsōgiga (2013), Child; Four Devas Member; School Girl
Ao Haru Ride (2014), School Girl, Female Customer
Engaged to the Unidentified (2014), Kobeni Yonomori
Haikyu!! (2014), Yūko
Yuki Yuna is a Hero (2014), Yūna Yūki
Chaos Dragon (2015), Meryll
The Idolmaster Cinderella Girls 2nd Season (2015), Momoka Sakurai
Brave Witches (2016), Georgette Lemare
Grimgar of Fantasy and Ash (2016), Shihoru
Kemono Friends (2017) Hippopotamus (ep. 1, 3, 12), Aardwolf (ep. 1, 12)
Schoogirl Strikers Animation Channel (2017), Koori Origami
Yuki Yuna is a Hero: Washio Sumi Chapter (2017), Yūna Yūki
Yuki Yuna is a Hero: Hero Chapter (2017), Yūna Yūki
Gundam Build Divers (2018), Sarah
Persona 5: The Animation (2018), Chihaya Mifune (replacing Miyu Matsuki)
The Day I Became a God (2020), Hikari Jingūji
Yashahime: Princess Half-Demon (2020), Mei Higurashi
Yuki Yuna is a Hero: The Great Mankai Chapter (2021), Yūna Yūki & Yūna Takashima
Shenmue (2022), Shenhua
The Idolmaster Cinderella Girls U149 (2023), Momoka Sakurai
Atelier Ryza: Ever Darkness & the Secret Hideout (2023), Lila Decyrus

Original Video Animation
Dragon Ball: Episode of Bardock (2011), Villager
Senjō no Valkyria 3: Taga Tame no Jūsō (2011), Clarissa Callaghan
A Channel + Smile (2012), Friend B
Ichigeki Sacchu!! HoiHoi-san Legacy (2013), Mayu Dōmeki

Web Anime
Kyōsōgiga Dainidan (2013), child A; Four Devas Member
Pretty Guardian Sailor Moon Crystal (2015), Club Member; Girl

Anime Films
Tamako Love Story (2014), 2nd Year Baton Club Member
The Tunnel to Summer, the Exit of Goodbyes (2022), Hanamoto-sensei

Video games
Valkyria Chronicles III (2011), Gisele Fleming, Clarissa Callaghan
Deception IV: Blood Ties (2014), Telma Mueller
Schoogirl Strikers (2014), Koori Origami
Kemono Friends (2015), Crested Ibis, Moose, Aardwolf, Nine-Tailed Fox, Indian Elephant, Southern Sea Otter.
Yuki Yuna is a Hero (2017), Yūna Yūki, Yūna Takashima, Yūna Akamine
Arknights (2019), Sussurro
Shenmue III (2019), Shenhua Ling
Atelier Ryza: Ever Darkness & the Secret Hideout (2019), Lila Decyrus
Kemono Friends 3, Hippopotamus
Persona 5 Royal (2019), Chihaya Mifune, Rumi
TOUHOU Spell Bubble (2020), Yuyuko Saigyouji
Atelier Ryza 2: Lost Legends & the Secret Fairy (2020), Lila Decyrus
Guardian Tales (2020), Tinia
Counter:Side (2021), Lumi
Artery Gear: Fusion (2022), Lila Decyrus
Xenoblade Chronicles 3 (2022), Shania
Azur Lane (2022), Lila Decyrus
Atelier Ryza 3: Alchemist of the End & the Secret Key (2023), Lila Decyrus

References

External links 
 Official agency profile 
 
 

1987 births
Living people
Voice actresses from Iwate Prefecture
Japanese video game actresses
Japanese voice actresses
21st-century Japanese actresses
Aoni Production voice actors